Historically, Portland has been a religious city. In modern times, however, it has become the least religious city in the United States.

According to a Public Religion Research Institute survey, 42% of Portlanders do not identify with any organized religion. That is 9% more that the two runner ups, San Francisco and Seattle, 33% each. Of these people, 4% identified as Atheists, 8% identified as Agnostic, and 29% said their religion is "nothing in particular."

History 
Like most American cities, for most of its history, Portland was overwhelmingly Christian. The first Protestant church in Oregon was built in Oregon City starting in 1842. Completed in 1844, this Methodist church was also the first Protestant church on the continental West Coast of what became the United States. The oldest existing church is St. John's Episcopal Church, now known as Oaks Pioneer Church. Fashioned from a partly completed house owned by pioneer Lot Whitcomb, it was the first Episcopal church in Oregon. The church was built in Milwaukie and the building was moved to its current location in Sellwood in 1961 after it had been practically abandoned in favor of a newer building which still exists today on the corner of SE Jefferson and 21st in Milwaukie. In an 1890 analysis of Portland, E. Kimbark MacColl wrote "Portland was well endowed with churches, with approximately one for every 600 residents." On July 26, 1897, the Northwestern States Mission (headquartered in Portland) was organized by the Church of Jesus Christ of Latter-day Saints (LDS Church) to search out Latter-day Saints who had moved to Oregon. In 1887, businessmen that were members of the LDS Church established a lumber mill near Baker, Oregon. This act, combined with the prophecies of church apostle Franklin D. Richards that there would be stakes in Oregon, led to the further migration of Latter-day Saints into the state.

Catholicism 

The city's archdiocese is the Roman Catholic Archdiocese of Portland in Oregon. The current archbishop of Portland is Alexander King Sample. St. Mary's Cathedral of the Immaculate Conception is the cathedral for the archdiocese. There are multiple religious orders in the area, including the Sisters of St. Mary of Oregon, the Servite Order, and the Franciscan Sisters of the Eucharist. The Grotto is a monastery on Rocky Butte that is known for their elaborate Christmas light displays.

The archdiocese operates ten High Schools, six of which are located in the Portland area. Central Catholic High School, De La Salle North Catholic High School, Jesuit High School, La Salle High School, St. Mary's Academy, and Valley Catholic School. The Franciscan Sisters of the Eucharist also operate the Franciscan Montessori Earth School & Saint Francis Academy which serves Pre-K through 8th grade.

History 
From 1843 to 1846, the Oregon Country was an apostolic vicariate, led by Francis Norbert Blanchet. In 1928, the Roman Catholic Archdiocese of Portland in Oregon was founded with Edward D. Howard as the first archbishop.

Protestantism

Baptists 
In addition to some Southern Baptist Churches, Portland has many Independent Baptist Churches. First Baptist Church is in Downtown Portland.

Episcopalianism 
The Episcopal Diocese of Oregon of the Episcopal Church serves Portland. Trinity Episcopal Cathedral is the Diocese's Cathedral. The current bishop is Diana Akiyama.

History 
On May 18, 1851, Two reverends along with four parishioners organized Trinity Episcopal Church in Portland. It was the first Episcopal congregation organized in the Oregon Territory. The two reverends went on to organize parishes in four other Oregon cities by the end of the year.

In 1853 the congregation had grown to 25 parishioners, and called its first rector, the Rev. John D. McCarty.A new building, located at the corner of Southwest Second Avenue and Oak Street in Portland on land donated by parishioner Benjamin Stark, was consecrated by the newly elected Missionary Bishop of the Missionary District of the Oregon and Washington Territories, the Right Rev. Thomas Fielding Scott, it was the first Episcopal church building north of San Francisco and west of St. Paul.

By 1871, Trinity had grown to over 200 members. The congregation had purchased a half block at the corner of Southwest Sixth Avenue and Oak Street for $3,000. In 1872 a new church building was built on this site that was thought to more accurately reflect the congregation's (and the City of Portland's) stature. The congregation in this period included many prominent Portlanders, including Cicero Hunt Lewis, Sylvester Pennoyer, Rodney Glisan, and Matthew Deady. In 1873, Trinity was involved in the founding of Good Samaritan Hospital. In 1902, the church building at Sixth and Oak was heavily damaged by fire, and the congregation decided to relocate yet again, to the more fashionable NW 19th Avenue, where many wealthy parishioners lived. This new building, in which the congregation still worships, was consecrated on October 14, 1906. The stained glass windows, the work of the Charles J. Connick Studios of Boston, date from the late 1940s.

Lutheranism 
Portland is part of the Oregon Synod of the Evangelical Lutheran Church in America and the Northwest District of the Lutheran Church–Missouri Synod. The Lutheran Church operated Concordia University in Northeast Portland until 2020.

History 
In 1889, missionaries established St. James Lutheran Church as Portland's first English-speaking Lutheran church. The first pastor was Rev. M. L. Zweizig. The church grew and thrived through the first half of the 20th century, and in 1956 added an educational annex, with space for classrooms and offices. The church was forced to remove the tower of the main building in 1951 due to structural deterioration and the tower was replaced in 1974 using historic photographs to match the original style and design as much as possible.

Methodism 
Portland is located within the Oregon-Idaho Conference of the United Methodist Church.

Methodism had a very large part in Oregon's history. Most of Oregon's earliest missionaries were Methodists and these missionaries were instrumental in the founding and establishment of many of Oregon's cities. (For more information, see Methodist Mission in Oregon).

Non-denominational 
Mannahouse Church (Formerly City Bible Church) is the largest church in Portland and is one of the 100 largest churches in the United States. They operate multiple campuses and run the Mannahouse Christian Academy (Formerly City Bible Schools).

Cedar Mill Bible Church is another mega-church located near Portland's western border with Beaverton.

Pentecostalism

Apostolic Faith Church 

Portland is the world headquarters of the Apostolic Faith Church. It was founded in 1906 by Florence L. Crawford, a participant in the Azusa Street Revival. William J. Seymour appointed Crawford as the state director of the Pacific Coast Apostolic Faith movement where she would help other missions and churches join the movement. Crawford's break with Seymour was complete by 1911 when she started the Apostolic Faith Church and most churches followed her.

Foursquare 
The Portland area is home to multiple Foursquare megachurches, including Beaverton Foursquare Church and Southlake Foursquare Church.

Independent Pentecostal 
Portland also has a few Independent Pentecostal Churches.

Presbyterianism 
Portland is a part of the Synod of the Pacific of the Presbyterian Church (USA) and the Pacific Northwest Presbytery of the Presbyterian Church in America.

Quakers 
Portland is home to five congregations of Quakers and George Fox University is run by the Friends General Conference.

LDS Church 

The LDS Church is the second-largest religious denomination in Oregon and many influential Latter-day Saints have lived in or came from Oregon, including former U.S. Senator Gordon H. Smith, basketball player and executive Danny Ainge, and former Oregon Secretary of State Dennis Richardson.

The Oregon Country was recommended by Henry Clay to Joseph Smith as a possible location for the Mormon pioneers to settle, however they ended up going to Utah. The church's settlement in Oregon largely began with the arrival of Latter-day Saint businessmen in 1887, when they built a lumber mill in Baker City. Many members slowly immigrated to the Portland area. In 1929, the first permanent meetinghouse was built in Ladd's Addition and still stands today as a Family History Library. As of 2020, there are 10 stakes located within the Oregon Portland Mission. The church operates the Portland Oregon Temple, two Institutes of Religion, and multiple Family History Libraries.

Christian Science 

The Portland area is home to ten Christian Science churches.

Jehovah's Witnesses 
Portland is home to many congregations of Jehovah's Witnesses.

Unitarianism 

In 1979, the Unitarian church purchased a larger church located directly adjacent to the original First Church of the Nazarene of Portland, which had been built in 1921. The Nazarene church congregation was preparing for construction of a new, larger building in the Sylvan neighborhood which exists and is in use to this day.

See also 

 Religion in Oregon
 The Church of Jesus Christ of Latter-day Saints in Oregon
 Roman Catholic Archdiocese of Portland in Oregon
 Apostolic Faith Church

References